Carlos Rogelio Licona (born March 3, 1995) is an American professional boxer who held the IBF mini flyweight title from 2018 to 2019.

Professional career
Licona turned professional on 5 December 2014 with a first-round knockout of Armando Diaz and amassed a 13–0 record during the next four years. His undefeated streak earned him the fight to face fellow unbeaten contender Mark Anthony Barriga for the vacant IBF mini flyweight title. The title bout was booked to face place on 1 December 2018, at the Staples Center in Los Angeles, California, on the Deontay Wilder vs. Tyson Fury undercard. Licona won the fight by split decision. Two judges scored the bout 115–113 in his favor, while the third judge awarded an identical scorecard to Barriga. 

Licona made his first IBF mini-flyweight title defense against the once-defeated Deejay Kriel on 16 February 2019, at the Microsoft Theater in Los Angeles, California. He lost the fight by a late twelfth-round knockout. Licona was up 108–101 on two of the judges' scorecards at the time of the stoppage. Licona faced Nohel Arambulet for the vacant WBC FECARBOX flyweight title on 26 July 2019, in his first fight post-title loss. He won the fight by unanimous decision, with scores of 117–111, 117–111 and 116–112.

Professional boxing record

See also
List of mini-flyweight boxing champions
List of Mexican boxing world champions

References

External links

1995 births
Living people
Mini-flyweight boxers
World mini-flyweight boxing champions
International Boxing Federation champions
Mexican male boxers
Boxers from Mexico City